

Results
Arsenal's score comes first

Legend

Football League First Division

Final League table

FA Cup

See also

 1919–20 in English football
 List of Arsenal F.C. seasons

References

English football clubs 1919–20 season
1919-20